Leandro Rodrigues da Silva (born 3 December 1985), known as Leandro Love, is a Brazilian footballer who plays for Rio Claro Futebol Clube - SP as a forward.

Club career
Born in São Paulo, he started his career with Rio Preto. On 8 August 2006 he was signed by J2 League club Vissel Kobe. He played his only league match on 30 September 2006. In December 2006 he was signed by Amparo but he was loaned to Rio Branco (SP) in January 2007 for Campeonato Paulista. He scored 4 goals in 17 games.

Melbourne Victory
On 3 July he was sold to Brasilis and loaned to A-League club Melbourne Victory FC soon after, as the fourth and last foreigner. He played 15 A-League games and once in the 2008 AFC Champions League; he was released on 30 June 2008.

Return to São Paulo state
In January 2009 he was loaned to Campeonato Paulista club Oeste. He scored one goal in eight appearances (only two in the starting linne-up). In May 2009 he left for ABC for 2009 Campeonato Brasileiro Série B but wasreleased before round one. He then left for Série C side Criciúma.

In December 2009 he was signed by Marília for 2010 Campeonato Paulista Série A2. He started all 19 matches and scored 12 goals, including 2 hat tricks.

In June 2010, he signed a 1-year contract with Linense for Copa Paulista and 2011 Campeonato Paulista. On 28 April 2011, he moved to Brazilian Série B club Portuguesa.

In December 2015, the Tricordiano-MG hired Leandro Love for the 2016 season. Since then he has played for São Bento (SP), Treze FC, Rio Claro FC and CS Seriog-SE. At the 2019/2020 season, he played for CRD Libolo.

References

External links
 
 

 Melbourne Victory profile 
CBF 

Brazilian footballers
Brazilian expatriate footballers
J2 League players
A-League Men players
Associação Portuguesa de Desportos players
C.R.D. Libolo players
Clube Atlético Juventus players
Clube Atlético Linense players
Criciúma Esporte Clube players
Grêmio Osasco Audax Esporte Clube players
Marília Atlético Clube players
Melbourne Victory FC players
Oeste Futebol Clube players
Red Bull Brasil players
Rio Branco Esporte Clube players
Vissel Kobe players
Association football forwards
Expatriate footballers in Japan
Expatriate soccer players in Australia
Footballers from São Paulo
1985 births
Living people